Yingjie Guo may refer to:

 Yingjie Guo (academic) (born 1957), professor of Chinese studies in Australia
 Yingjie Jay Guo (born 1958), communications engineer in Australia